The Duke of Exeter's daughter was a torture rack in the Tower of London. Its presence is said to have been due to John Holland, 2nd Duke of Exeter, the constable of the Tower in 1447, whence it got its name.

Blackstone wrote in c. 1765 (Commentaries, ii. sec. 326):

References

European instruments of torture
Modern instruments of torture 
Individual instruments of torture